Köl-Suu (also Көлсуу) is an alpine lake in At-Bashy District of Naryn Region of southeastern Kyrgyzstan. It is located at 3514 m elevation in the Kakshaal Too mountain range, central Tian Shan.

The river draining the lake starts from underground location and the water gushes out between the soil and rocks below the lake. The lake may also sometimes get totally empty as happened in 2019 making it similar to the Merzbacher lake that also resides in Kyrgyzstan.

References 

Lakes of Kyrgyzstan
Mountain lakes